Andreas Ton (born September 21, 1962) is a former Italian-born Swiss professional ice hockey right winger who last played for HC Lugano in Switzerland's National League A.

Ton has participated as a member of the Swiss national team in numerous international tournaments, including the 1992 Winter Olympics.

References

External links

Living people
Italian expatriate sportspeople in Switzerland
1962 births
Ice hockey players at the 1992 Winter Olympics
Olympic ice hockey players of Switzerland
HC Lugano players
ZSC Lions players
Swiss ice hockey right wingers